Hexacelsian is a rare barium silicate mineral with the formula BaAl2Si2O8. It was discovered in the Hatrurim Basin in Israel, where the Hatrurim Formation of rocks formed due to exposed pyrometamorphism.

Relation to other minerals
As suggested by its name, hexacelsian is related to celsian. This relation is polymorphous (celsian, a feldspar-group mineral, is monoclinic). Beside celsian, it is chemically similar to cymrite.

External links
 Hexacelsian on Mindat:

References

Silicate minerals
Sodium minerals
Hexagonal minerals
Minerals in space group 193